Muricauda zhangzhouensis is a Gram-negative, rod-shaped and non-motile bacterium from the genus of Muricauda which has been isolated from mangrove sediments from the Fugong Mangrove Nature Reservation Area in the Fujian province in China.

References

Further reading 
 </

External links
Type strain of Muricauda zhangzhouensis at BacDive -  the Bacterial Diversity Metadatabase

Flavobacteria
Bacteria described in 2013